The Xinhao or Signal Hill, located to the south of Guanxiang Hill and to the southwest of Qingdao Hill, is a landmark of Qingdao, China, well known for its three torch-like towers. It is one of the best locations to overview both the sea and the downtown area.

References

Tourist attractions in Qingdao
Parks in Shandong